Gollegiella (Northern Sámi for "golden language", and ) is a pan-Nordic Sámi language award founded in 2004 by the ministers for Sámi affairs and the presidents of the Sámi Parliaments in Norway, Sweden, and Finland with the aim of promoting, developing and preserving the Sámi languages. The biennial award comes with a monetary prize that is currently 15,000 euros.

Individuals and institutions in Norway, Sweden, Finland, and Russia can nominate candidates. The award can be won by people, groups, organizations, and institutions individually or collectively.

Recipients 
 2004: Ella Holm Bull and Anarâškielâ servi
 2006: Harald Gaski and Jouni Moshnikoff
 2008: Sami Siida in Utsjoki and Henrik Barruk
 2010: Máret Sárá and Lajla Mattsson Magga
 2012: Aleksandra Antonova and Nina Afanasyeva; Divvun and Giellatekno
 2014: Mikael Svonni, Kerttu Vuolab, and Seija Sivertsen
 2016: Kirsi Paltto, Jan Skoglund Paltto, Ingá-Márja Steinfjell, and Máret Steinfjell
 2018: Karin Tuolja (Jokkmokk) and Jekaterina Mechkina (Murmansk)
 2020: Ellen Pautamo and Jonar Thomasson
 2022: Ole Henrik Magga

References

External links 
 Gollegiella at the Norwegian Ministry of Local Government and Modernisation (in Norwegian)
 Gollegiella at the Swedish Sámi Parliament (in Swedish)
 Gollegiella at the Finnish Sámi Parliament (in Finnish)

Awards established in 2004
European awards
Language-related awards
Awards for contributions to culture
Sámi culture